Frith Lake is a lake in the Unorganized Part of Thunder Bay District in northwestern Ontario, Canada. The lake is on Kelvin Island, a large island in Lake Nipigon, and is thus in the Great Lakes Basin.

Hydrology
It is on Kelvin Island, a large island in Lake Nipigon, making Frith Lake a lake on an island in a lake. Frith Lake itself has a small islet.

There are three unnamed inflows, at the west, southwest and east. The primary outflow is an unnamed creek at the northwest that flows to northwest Lake Nipigon, and then via the Nipigon River to Lake Superior.

Natural history
The lake is part of the Lake Nipigon Conservation Reserve.

References

Lakes of Thunder Bay District